Reino Heino (born 28 June 1941) is a Finnish gymnast. He competed in eight events at the 1968 Summer Olympics.

References

1941 births
Living people
Finnish male artistic gymnasts
Olympic gymnasts of Finland
Gymnasts at the 1968 Summer Olympics
Gymnasts from Tampere
20th-century Finnish people